Christina Kim Ingrid Asplund, better known as Kissey (formerly Kissey Asplund), is a singer, songwriter, music producer, artist, and performer from Stockholm, Sweden.

Career 
Kissey released her first full-length album, Plethora, produced by Papa Jazz, on R2 Records in 2008. She has collaborated with many other producers and artists such as Zed Bias (Maddslinky), Jay Scarlett, Dorian Concept, Domu, Blu, Ben Mono, Rustie, Machinedrum, and Rampa, resulting in numerous releases as a featured vocalist. She is rumored to be working on her second album (title and label unknown).

Kissey has performed throughout The United States and Europe, including appearances at The Hultsfred Festival in Sweden, Heineken Refreshing Sounds Sessions' Welcome to Detroit concert in Amsterdam, The Netherlands, Dante's Fried Chicken, opening for Dizzee Rascal and Aaron LaCrate  and appearing as a guest with The Roots, both at The Highline Ballroom in New York City. Kissey has also shared the stage with Little Dragon, Theophilus London, Dj Antipop, Guilty Simpson and Black Milk.

Noteworthy media include MTV Iggy, Current TV, BBC Radio 1 (Benji B & Gilles Peterson), Okayplayer, KCRW, and SR P3.

Kissey has been shot by celebrated photographers Jonas Åkerlund for Elle magazine and Shawn Mortensen for Nike's AM90 campaign, as one of eight featured artists/faces, internationally.

Releases

Discography 
Albums:
 "Plethora" (2008)

EPs:
 "Fuss'n'Fight Ep" (2008)
 "Initiation" (2014)

Singles:
"Come Nightfall" (2013)
 "Silverlake/Snowfall" (2008)
 "Move Me/99 bottles" (2008)
 "With You" (2007)

Featured Artist

References

External links 
 Official Website

1982 births
Living people
Swedish electronic musicians
Swedish pop singers
21st-century Swedish singers
21st-century Swedish women singers